Sleep's Holy Mountain (also known as Holy Mountain) is the second studio album by the American heavy metal band Sleep. It was released in November 1992 in Europe and March 1993 in the US through Earache Records.

Release and reception 
The recordings that would become Sleep's Holy Mountain were originally sent to independent label Earache as a demo. The label immediately signed the band and released the recordings exactly as they were received. It was the last album to be released by the band as a fully functioning group for a while, as their subsequent albums up to 2018's The Sciences were released after the group had broken up.

The album, which includes the word "stoner" in the lyrics of two songs and prominently features cannabis leaves in its album art,  is widely considered one of the seminal albums in the evolution of stoner rock. It became a favourite of the heavy metal press and the band was heralded, along with Kyuss, as leaders of the emerging stoner metal scene.

The songs "Dragonaut" and "Some Grass" are used in the 1997 Harmony Korine film Gummo.

In May 2009, the album was performed live in its entirety as part of the All Tomorrow's Parties-curated Don't Look Back series.

Track listing 
All music/lyrics written by Sleep except "Snowblind".

2009 reissue bonus tracks

Credits 
Al Cisneros – bass guitar, vocals
Matt Pike – guitar
Chris Hakius – drums
Cover artwork by Robert Klem
Produced and engineered by Billy Anderson

Pressing history

References

External links 
 Sleep's Holy Mountain (CD) at Earache Records site

1993 albums
Sleep (band) albums
Earache Records albums
Albums produced by Billy Anderson (producer)